Catherine Clarke is an American biochemist who is a Professor of Chemistry at the University of California, Los Angeles. She was the first woman to serve as Head of the Department of Chemistry and Biochemistry. Her research considers the functional roles of Coenzyme Q.

Early life and education 
Clarke was an undergraduate and graduate student at the University of California, Los Angeles. Her doctoral research considered the regulation of cholesterol metabolism. After completing her doctoral research, she joined Princeton University as a post-doctoral fellow. She eventually returned to UCLA, where she studied polyisoprene and non-sterol metabolism. Whilst at UCLA, she started working on the biosynthesis of coenzyme Q using the yeast model.

Research and career 
Clarke joined the chemistry and biochemistry department at University of California, Los Angeles in 1993. She was eventually promoted to Professor. Her research considers how cells synthesize coenzyme Q, a non-protein chemical compound that is also known as ubiquinone. Coenzyme Q is a naturally occurring enzyme cofactor found in the mitochondria of the body cells.

Clarke makes use of the yeast Saccharomyces cerevisiae and nematode Caenorhabditis elegans to understand the fundamental mechanisms that underpin the inter- and intracellular charge transport of Coenzyme Q. Clarke studies a respiratory defective Saccharomyces cerevisiae mutant that is deficient in coenzyme Q. By characterizing the yeast and polypeptide proteins that are required for the synthesis of coenzyme Q, Clarke has shown that it is possible to investigate these defects. She has shown that yeast and other eukaryotes share the same biosynthetic pathway, and that a large multi-subunit complex within the mitochondrial matrix is required for Q biosynthesis.

Clarke is also interested in the ageing process. It has been shown that gene mutations which increase the lifespan of nematodes such as Caenorhabditis elegans have homologs in vertebrates, act through highly conserved mechanisms. Mutations in the CLK1 gene of C. elegans can give rise to longer lifespans and are defective in the biosynthesis of Coenzyme Q. These results indicate that CLK1 is essential for the biosynthesis of Coenzyme Q. Her research involves understanding how diet, environment and genotype impact longevity.

In June 2016, Clarke became the first woman to lead the UCLA Department of Chemistry and Biochemistry. Clarke was appointed Dean of Special Projects in the UCLA Division of Physical Sciences in 2019.

Selected publications

References 

American women biochemists
Living people
Year of birth missing (living people)
University of California, Los Angeles alumni
University of California, Los Angeles faculty
Princeton University faculty
21st-century American women